The West Lyn is a river in England which rises high in Exmoor, Somerset, and joins the East Lyn at Lynmouth in Devon.

The upper reaches have been designated as a Site of Special Scientific Interest, because of the geomorphological landforms created in the 1952 flood.

The lower reaches of the river towards Lynmouth, known as the Glen Lyn Gorge, is a tourist attraction including a museum about the local water cycle, the floods of 1952, and a small hydroelectric plant.

Water is piped from the river to generate hydroelectric power for the Lynton and Lynmouth Cliff Railway, which is a water-balance funicular railway.

References

Rivers of Somerset
Exmoor
Lynton and Lynmouth
1WestLynn